The United States Navy lists two warships bearing the name USS Vital:

 , a steel-hulled minesweeper, laid down on 1 January 1942 at Chickasaw, Alabama.
 , a wooden-hulled minesweeper, laid down as AM-474 on 31 October 1952 at Manitowoc, Wisconsin.

United States Navy ship names